Nicolae S. Petrescu-Găină (March 31, 1871; Craiova, Romania – February 15, 1931; Bucharest, Romania) was a Romanian cartoonist.

Bibliography
 Paul Rezeanu: Caricaturistul N.S. Petrescu-Găină, Editura Alma, Craiova, 2008
 Victoria Ionescu: Albumul „Contimporani” de Nicolae Petrescu Găină, MIM, nr. 1/1964
 Caricatura militară în presa umoristică românească, de la Unire până la Războiul cel Mare (1859 - 1916) de Horia Vladimir Șerbănescu

References 

1871 births
1931 deaths
Romanian cartoonists